Warren County is a county located in the U.S. state of Mississippi. As of the 2020 census, the population was 44,722. Its county seat is Vicksburg. Established by legislative act of December 22, 1809, Warren County is named for American Revolutionary War officer Joseph Warren.

Part of the Mississippi Delta and the historic cotton culture, Warren County is included in the Vicksburg, MS Micropolitan Statistical Area, which is also included in the Jackson-Vicksburg-Brookhaven, MS Combined Statistical Area.

Geography

The county exists in two sections, connected only by a narrow 500 foot wide section between Madison Parish, Louisiana and Issaquena County, Mississippi along the delta of the Yazoo River. This area was once along the Mississippi River, but has since become an oxbow lake and marsh and no roads traverse this strip of land. The community of Eagle Bend is in this area.

Major highways
  Interstate 20
  U.S. Route 61
  U.S. Route 80
  Mississippi Highway 3
  Mississippi Highway 27

Adjacent counties
 Issaquena County (north)
 Yazoo County (northeast)
 Hinds County (east)
 Claiborne County (south)
 Tensas Parish, Louisiana (southwest)
 Madison Parish, Louisiana (west)

National protected areas
 Theodore Roosevelt National Wildlife Refuge (part)
 Vicksburg National Military Park (part)

Demographics

2020 census

As of the 2020 United States Census, there were 44,722 people, 18,235 households, and 11,480 families residing in the county.

2010 census
As of the 2010 United States Census, there were 48,773 people living in the county. 50.3% were White, 47.0% Black or African American, 0.8% Asian, 0.3% Native American, 0.7% of some other race and 0.9% of two or more races. 1.8% were Hispanic or Latino (of any race).

2000 census
As of the census of 2000, there were 49,644 people, 18,756 households, and 13,222 families living in the county.  The population density was 85 people per square mile (33/km2).  There were 20,789 housing units at an average density of 35 per square mile (14/km2).  The racial makeup of the county was 54.97% White, 43.19% Black or African American, 0.23% Native American, 0.62% Asian, 0.02% Pacific Islander, 0.33% from other races, and 0.66% from two or more races.  1.04% of the population were Hispanic or Latino of any race.

2005 census estimates based on the American Community Survey suggested that non-Hispanic whites were 51.5% of Warren County's population.  Warren County was the only county in Mississippi along the Mississippi River, in addition to Desoto, where whites made up a majority of the population. African Americans were 46.0% of the county's population. People identifying as of two or more races were 0.6%, less than in the previous ACS. The Latino population was 1.2% of the total for the county.

In 2000 there were 18,756 households, out of which 35.60% had children under the age of 18 living with them, 46.80% were married couples living together, 19.10% had a female householder with no husband present, and 29.50% were non-families. 25.80% of all households were made up of individuals, and 9.70% had someone living alone who was 65 years of age or older.  The average household size was 2.61 and the average family size was 3.14.

In the county, the population was spread out, with 28.50% under the age of 18, 9.10% from 18 to 24, 28.40% from 25 to 44, 22.40% from 45 to 64, and 11.70% who were 65 years of age or older.  The median age was 35 years. For every 100 females there were 88.30 males.  For every 100 females age 18 and over, there were 84.40 males.

The median income for a household in the county was $35,056, and the median income for a family was $41,706. Males had a median income of $33,566 versus $21,975 for females. The per capita income for the county was $17,527.  About 15.00% of families and 18.70% of the population were below the poverty line, including 27.80% of those under age 18 and 16.20% of those age 65 or over.

Warren County has the seventh highest per capita income in the State of Mississippi.

Government and politics

Board of Supervisors
Members are elected from each of the five supervisory districts.  The Board of Supervisors guides and establishes policies for the county government. Members of the board of make decisions regarding economic development, public health and welfare and county roads.

National politics

Communities

City
 Vicksburg (county seat and only municipality)

Census-designated places
 Beechwood
 Bovina
 Eagle Bend
 Redwood

Unincorporated communities

 Flowers
 Rose Hill
 Waltersville
 Warrenton
 Yokena

Ghost town
 Brunswick

Notable people
 Sarah Gibson Humphreys (1830–1907), author and woman suffragist

See also
 National Register of Historic Places listings in Warren County, Mississippi
 Joseph A. Biedenharn, first bottler of Coca-Cola

References

External links
 Warren County, Mississippi

 
Mississippi counties
Mississippi counties on the Mississippi River
1809 establishments in Mississippi Territory
Populated places established in 1809
Majority-minority counties in Mississippi